NMSC may refer to:
 National Merit Scholarship Corporation
 Northwestern Mindanao State College of Science and Technology
 National Marine Science Centre, Australia
 Non-melanoma skin cancer
 North Mississauga Soccer Club